The Department of Earth Sciences at Cambridge is the University of Cambridge's Earth Sciences department. First formed around 1731, the department incorporates the Sedgwick Museum of Earth Sciences.

History
The department's history can be traced back to 1731 when the 1st Woodwardian Professor of Geology was appointed, in accordance with the bequest of John Woodward. The present Department of Earth Sciences was formed by an amalgamation of the Department of Geology, Department of Geodesy and Geophysics and the Department of Mineralogy and Petrology in 1980.

The main location of the department is at the Downing Site, Downing St. The Bullard Laboratories, located in West Cambridge on Madingley Rd is a satellite department of the main building.  The department incorporates the Sedgwick Museum of Earth Sciences and the Godwin Laboratory.

The department is the home of the Sedgwick Club, which was founded in memory of Adam Sedgwick in 1880, and is the oldest student run geological society in the world.

Notable people

Fellows and Former Fellows
Simon Conway Morris FRS
Michael Bickle FRS
Marie Edmonds
Harry Elderfield FRS
David Hodell (Woodwardian Professor of Geology)
Timothy Holland FRS
 Marian Holness FRS
James Jackson FRS CBE 
Nick McCave (Former Woodwardian Professor of Geology)
Dan McKenzie FRS CH
Simon Redfern 
Ekhard Salje FRS 
Bob White FRS
Eric Wolff FRS

Alumni
 Stuart Agrell
 Sir David Attenborough CH
 John Auden
 George Band OBE
 Derek Briggs FRS
 Euan Clarkson
 Claire Craig CBE
 Charles Darwin
 Gertrude Elles
 Richard Fortey FRS
 Sir Vivian Fuchs FRS
 Alfred Harker FRS
 W. Brian Harland
Dorothy Hill FRS
Ted Irving FRS
John E Marr FRS
Sir Mark Moody-Stuart
Yin Yin Nwe
Sanjaasürengiin Oyuun
 Julian Pearce
 Adam Sedgwick
 Fred Vine FRS
 Lawrence Wager FRS
 Gino Watkins
 Kathryn Whaler OBE
 Leonard Wills
 Sir James Wordie CBE

Former staff
 Edward Bullard FRS
 Oliver Bulman
 Alex Deer FRS
 O T Jones FRS
 Drummond Matthews FRS
 W H Miller FRS
 Stephen Nockolds
 Noel Odell
 Sir Keith O'Nions FRS
 Lord Oxburgh FRS
 Colin Pillinger FRS CBE
 Barrie Rickards (Extensive studies on graptolites)
Nick Shackleton FRS (Winner of the Wollaston Medal)
 R. S. J. Sparks FRS CBE
 C E Tilley FRS
 Harry Whittington FRS

References

External links
 University of Cambridge Dept. of Earth Sciences
 Sedgwick Museum
 Sedgwick Club

 
Earth Sciences, Department of